The 2001 Tashkent Open was a women's tennis tournament played on hard courts at the Tashkent Tennis Center in Tashkent, Uzbekistan that was part of the Tier IV category of the 2001 WTA Tour. It was the third edition of the tournament and was held from 11 June through 17 June 2001. Sixth-seeded Bianka Lamade won the singles title and earned $22,000 first-prize money.

Finals

Singles
 Bianka Lamade defeated  Seda Noorlander, 6–3, 2–6, 6–2
 It was Lamade's only singles title of her career

Doubles
 Petra Mandula /  Patricia Wartusch defeated  Tatiana Perebiynis /  Tatiana Poutchek, 6–1, 6–4

References

External links
 Official website
 ITF tournament edition details
 Tournament draws

Tashkent Open
Tashkent Open
Tashkent Open
Tashkent Open